Ball Glacier is a small glacier separating Redshaw Point from Hamilton Point, flowing north-east to Markham Bay on the south-east side of James Ross Island. It was named by the UK Antarctic Place-names Committee in 1995 after H. William Ball (b. 1926), Keeper of Paleontology, British Museum (Natural History), 1966–86, and author of Falklands Islands Dependencies Survey Scientific Report No. 24 on fossils from the James Ross Island area.
The region has a low frequency of winds mainly due to the orography of the Antarctic peninsula which affects airflow throughout the region along the eastern coast of the Antarctic Peninsula. The region is moderated by cold air masses passing through the area. They are of continental origins, coming mainly from the south and southwest but can be significantly reduced by the island's advection of oceanic air masses.

See also
 List of glaciers in the Antarctic
 Glaciology

References

 

Glaciers of James Ross Island